Soskin is a Russian masculine surname, its feminine counterpart is Soskina. It may refer to
Betty Reid Soskin (born 1921), American Park Ranger 
Mark Soskin (born 1953), American jazz pianist 
Paul Soskin (1905–1975), Russian-born British screenwriter and film producer
Renee Soskin (1916–1998), British teacher and politician
Selig Soskin (1873–1959), Israeli agronomist

Russian-language surnames